Andarivaadu: Man of the Masses is a 2005 India Telugu-language action comedy drama film directed by Srinu Vytla. The film stars Chiranjeevi, Tabu, Rimi Sen, and Rakshita while Prakash Raj,Sunil and Pradeep Rawat play supporting roles.

Plot 
Govindarajulu is a mesthri (construction worker) who drinks a lot and lives a carefree life. On the other hand, his son Siddartha alias Siddu is a popular TV show host and a very disciplined man — the opposite of his father. Siddu gets Govinda married to Shanti to sober him.

Siddu is in love with Swetha, the daughter of a big-time contractor named Veerendra. Veerendra happens to be a childhood friend of Govinda but currently dislikes him due to his behaviour and social status. He agrees to get Swetha married to Siddu but tells Govinda that in order for the marriage to take place, he must distance himself from Siddu, as Veerendra does not like Govinda's influence on Siddu. Govinda, being the loving and caring father that he is, decides to fake kicking Siddu out of the house so that the latter can marry Swetha.

At the engagement, though, Siddu publicly revealing the condition that Veerendra has given. It is revealed that Govinda's friend had told Siddu about the condition, and it is the sole reason that Siddu was kicked out of the house. Siddu returns to Govinda, and a vengeful Swetha decides to separate the family and have Siddu for herself. She begs Govinda to forgive her and take her as his daughter-in-law, as she had not known about Veerendra's condition.

Govinda says that if Siddu wants her, then he is willing to have her in the house because he holds no grudge and wants Siddu to be happy. Siddu decides that as long as Govinda is happy, he is too, and agrees to marry Swetha.

Meanwhile, Govinda has differences with a big-time rowdy and contractor named Satti Pehelwan. Swetha moves into the house and starts creating differences between Govinda and Siddu with the help of her cousin Sathi Babu, but she fails miserably each time. The rest of the film revolves around whether she succeeds in her schemes.

Cast

Soundtrack

Reception 
B. Anuradha of Rediff.com wrote "Barring some rib-tickling comedy, the much-hyped Andharivadu is a huge disappointment as it lacks a good storyline." A reviewer from Sify also echoed the same and stated: "There is nothing new as far as presentation goes and on the whole it is a damp squib. A Chiranjeevi film will work only if his larger-than-life image is given a new twist with something freash in treatment and director Seenu Vytla has not been able to provide the necessary punch."

References

External links 
 

2005 films
Films directed by Srinu Vaitla
Geetha Arts films
Indian action comedy-drama films
2000s masala films
2000s Telugu-language films